Mark Templeton (born 1976) is a Canadian experimental electronic artist. Templeton's works are released by New York City record label Anticipate Recordings.

Background

Templeton utilizes acoustic instruments, found sounds and sampled material to construct textured, collage-like electronic compositions His style has been called 'glitchy', but also 'painterly', in an attempt to describe his deconstruction and crumbling of instruments' traditional voices.

His works have been commissioned by organizations of contemporary dance, film  and audiovisual disciplines. Collaborations with experimental filmmakers aAron Munson and Kyle Armstrong and sound artists Nicola Ratti and Ezekiel Honig have produced numerous works on various formats.

Templeton has performed at international festivals and alternative spaces such as MUTEK (Montreal), Unsound Festival (Kraków), send+receive: a festival of sound (Winnipeg), Eat This Festival (Utrecht), Galapagos (New York), Latitude 53 (Edmonton) and Suoni Per Il Popolo Festival (Montreal).

Discography 

 Fields Awake (2005, Independent) [CD+DVD]
 Frail as Breath (2005, Independent/Robotopera)
 Standing on a Hummingbird (2007, Anticipate Recordings)
 Acre Loss (2009, Anticipate Recordings) [CD+DVD]
 Inland (2009, Anticipate Recordings)
 Sea Point (2009, Anticipate Recordings) [12" vinyl]
 Ballads (2010, Independent)
 Scotch Heart (2011, Sweat Lodge Guru) [cassette]
 Mark Templeton Mort Aux Vaches (2011, Staalplaat)
 Jealous Heart (2013, Under the Spire) [12" vinyl]

References

External links 
 Mark Templeton's Official Website
 Anticipate Recordings' Official Website

Ambient musicians
Electroacoustic improvisation
Canadian electronic musicians
Musicians from Edmonton
1976 births
Living people